Gracie Gillam (born Grace Victoria Phipps; May 4, 1992), formerly credited as Grace Phipps, is an American actress, singer, and dancer. She is well known for starring in the Disney Channel movies Teen Beach Movie and Teen Beach 2.

Early life 
Gillam was born in Austin, Texas, to Kate and Gil Phipps. She has a younger brother named Liam.

She was raised in Boerne, Texas and San Antonio, Texas. She graduated from Robert E. Lee High School's North East School of the Arts, where she majored in musical theater and graduated summa cum laude. She is currently an undergraduate student at Columbia University. 

In 2010, she won the Las Casas Performing Arts Scholarship Competition.  A Los Angeles agent signed Gillam after seeing her star as Rizzo in a theater production of the musical Grease.

Career

Acting
Following her 2010 high school graduation, Gillam moved to Los Angeles to pursue a career in acting. After seven days there, she landed the prime role as Bee in the DreamWorks 2011 major movie remake of the 1985 comedy horror film Fright Night. That year, she also originated the regular role of Amy in the ABC Family fantasy drama series The Nine Lives of Chloe King. The series was cancelled after one season.

In 2012 through 2013, Gillam was cast as April Young, a recurring character in The CW's supernatural drama The Vampire Diaries, and appeared in 10 episodes of the fourth season.

In 2013, Gillam appeared as cute biker girl Lela, in an Annette Funicello impression, in Teen Beach Movie, a Disney Channel Original Movie, singing and dancing along with Ross Lynch and Maia Mitchell.  The movie, with an audience of 13.5 million viewers, was the second-highest rated cable movie in television history.  Phipps had a number of featured solos, including the song "Falling for Ya".

Also in 2013, Gillam appeared in three episodes of the ABC TV comedy series Baby Daddy as Megan, the love interest of Ben (Jean-Luc Bilodeau), in the fantasy-horror TV series Supernatural as Hael, and in the short The Signal as Zoe. The following year, Phipps appeared in Disney's teen sitcom Austin & Ally episode "Directors & Divas", as diva movie star Brandy Braxton.

In 2015, Gillam starred and reprised her role as fiercely independent and brassy biker chick Lela in a sequel teen musical, Teen Beach 2, along with Ross Lynch, Maia Mitchell, Garrett Clayton, and John DeLuca.  It premiered with 5.8 million viewers, as the most-watched cable movie of 2015.

Also in 2015, Gillam starred in the horror movie Dark Summer, playing the part of Mona Wilson. She also played the lead role of a troubled teen cheerleader named Kaitlin in the emotional horror/slasher film Some Kind of Hate, which was featured in the 2015 Stanley Film Festival, the Fantasia International Film Festival, and FrightFest.

That year, she also appeared in three episodes of the black comedy-horror TV series Scream Queens on Fox as Mandy, and was a beauty gangleader  named Alice in Paul Solet's punk rock revenge segment of horror comedy Tales of Halloween. In addition, she appeared in the police procedural drama TV series CSI: Cyber as Vanessa Gillerman, and in the police procedural TV series Hawaii Five-0 as Erica Young.  She was also featured on the cover of the June/July 2015 issue of Girls' Life.

She appeared on the Syfy TV series Z Nation as Sgt. Lilly from 2017 to 2018.

Music
The Teen Beach Movie soundtrack, which entered the Billboard 200 chart at number eight in July 2013, was released featuring songs performed by Gillam, including her as a main artist in the song "Falling for Ya" and featured in the songs "Cruisin' for a Bruisin'", "Like Me", "Meant to Be", and "Coolest Cats in Town". "Cruisin' for a Bruisin'" and "Falling for Ya" topped Billboard'''s Kid Digital charts for weeks, with "Falling for Ya" reaching number 25 on the Heatseekers Songs chart and number 66 on the Hot Digital Songs chart. 

In 2014, Phipps appeared in the Austin & Ally episode "Directors & Divas" and performed "The Pilot and the Mermaid" with Ross Lynch.

In 2015, her song "Gotta Be Me" from Teen Beach 2'' was nominated in the Teen Choice Awards as the Choice Song from a Movie or TV Show; she sang the song with Ross Lynch, Maia Mitchell, Garrett Clayton, John Deluca, and Jordan Fisher.

Filmography

Discography

Soundtrack albums

Singles

Other charted songs

References

External links

 
 

1992 births
Living people
21st-century American actresses
21st-century American singers
Actresses from Austin, Texas
Actresses from San Antonio
American film actresses
American television actresses
Musicians from Austin, Texas
Musicians from San Antonio
People from Boerne, Texas
Singers from Texas
Columbia University School of General Studies alumni